Laguna, California may refer to:

 Laguna, Sacramento County, California, former census-designated place
 Laguna West-Lakeside, Elk Grove, California, a community in and around what has since become the city of Elk Grove, California 
 Laguna, Los Angeles County, California, now part of Commerce, California
 Laguna Beach, California, city in Orange County
 Laguna Hills, California, city in Orange County
 Laguna Niguel, California, city in Orange County
 Laguna Woods, California, city in Orange County

See also
 Laguna (disambiguation)